John Cameron Cartwright (born 29 November 1933) is a former politician in the United Kingdom.  He was a Labour and then an SDP Member of Parliament (MP) representing Woolwich East then Woolwich from the October 1974 general election to the 1992 election.

Early life
Educated at Woking County Grammar School, he was the star of the school's Dramatic Society, for which he played numerous Shakespearean and Goldsmithian ladies. One such production was seen by the Norwegian ambassador, who was so impressed that he invited the whole production to perform in Oslo and Bergen.

Political career
Initially an Executive Officer in the Home Civil Service, Cartwright's political career began when he became a constituency agent for the Labour Party in 1955. Serving twelve years in that role, he was later employed as Political Secretary of the Royal Arsenal Co-operative Society (R.A.C.S.) and as a councillor in Greenwich, where he became the Labour Group leader and, subsequently, leader of the council from 1971 to 1974. He unsuccessfully contested Bexley at the 1970 general election (losing to Edward Heath) and Bexleyheath at the February 1974 election (losing to Cyril Townsend). At the October 1974 election Cartwright was elected as the Labour member for Woolwich East, replacing Christopher Mayhew (who had left Labour to join the Liberal Party the year before).

Following six years as a backbench member of parliament and latterly Parliamentary Private Secretary to Shirley Williams, Cartwright himself left the Labour Party in 1981 to become one of the founding members of the SDP. He served as the SDP's chief whip from 1983 onwards and as its president from 1987. He also served as the SDP/Liberal Alliance's chief defence spokesman from 1983 to 1987. A close political ally of David Owen, he stayed loyal to Owen's 'continuing' SDP after the Liberal Party and a majority of the SDP merged in January 1988 to become the Liberal Democrats.

After the collapse of the continuing SDP in 1990, Cartwright stood for re-election as an 'Independent Social Democrat' – albeit one endorsed by the Liberal Democrats – but lost by 2,200 votes.

Life after politics
After leaving active politics he went on to serve as Deputy Chairman of the Police Complaints Authority before retiring to Kent.

References

Sources

External links 
 

1933 births
Living people
Labour Party (UK) MPs for English constituencies
Councillors in the Royal Borough of Greenwich
Social Democratic Party (UK) MPs for English constituencies
Independent politicians in England
UK MPs 1974–1979
UK MPs 1979–1983
UK MPs 1983–1987
UK MPs 1987–1992
Labour Party (UK) councillors
Members of the Fabian Society
Social Democratic Party (UK, 1988) MPs